This is a list of Billboard magazine's Top Hot 100 songs of 1977. The Top 100, as revealed in the year-end edition of Billboard dated December 24, 1977, is based on Hot 100 charts from the issue dates of November 6, 1976 through October 29, 1977.

See also
1977 in music
List of Billboard Hot 100 number-one singles of 1977
List of Billboard Hot 100 top-ten singles in 1977

References

1977 record charts
Billboard charts